The 2019–20 Howard Bison men's basketball team represented Howard University in the 2019–20 NCAA Division I men's basketball season. The Bison, led by first-year head coach Kenny Blakeney, played their home games at Burr Gymnasium in Washington, D.C. as members of the Mid-Eastern Athletic Conference. They finished the season 4–29, 1–15 in MEAC play to finish in last place. They defeated South Carolina State in the first round of the MEAC tournament before losing to North Carolina A&T in the quarterfinals.

Previous season
The Bison finished the 2018–19 season 17–17, 10–6 in MEAC play to finish in a tie for third place. In the MEAC tournament, they defeated Bethune–Cookman in the quarterfinals, before falling to Norfolk State in the semifinals. They were invited to the CBI, where they lost in the first round to Coastal Carolina.

On March 27, 2019, it was announced that head coach Kevin Nickelberry had resigned, ending his nine-year tenure with the team. On May 6, it was announced that Columbia assistant Kenny Blakeney would be Howard's next head coach.

Roster

Schedule and results

|-
!colspan=12 style=| Exhibition

|-
!colspan=12 style=| Non-conference regular season

|-
!colspan=9 style=| MEAC regular season

|-
!colspan=12 style=| MEAC tournament
|-

|-

Source

References

Howard Bison men's basketball seasons
Howard Bison
Howard Bison men's basketball
Howard Bison men's basketball